The Chesterfield County Courthouse and Courthouse Square is a historic county courthouse complex located at Chesterfield, Virginia.  The complex includes the old Chesterfield County Courthouse, built in 1917; the county clerk's office buildings, dating from 1828 and 1889; and the old Chesterfield County Jail, constructed in 1892 and closed in 1960. The 1917 courthouse is a one- and two-story red brick structure, fronted by a full-height portico, and topped by an octagonal belfry, in the Colonial Revival style.

It was listed on the National Register of Historic Places in 1992.

References

County courthouses in Virginia
Government buildings on the National Register of Historic Places in Virginia
National Register of Historic Places in Chesterfield County, Virginia
Colonial Revival architecture in Virginia
Government buildings completed in 1917
Buildings and structures in Chesterfield County, Virginia